Doubleheader or double header may refer to:
Doubleheader (baseball), two baseball games played between the same two teams on the same day
Doubleheader (television), a broadcast of two games back-to-back
Double heading, using two railway locomotives to pull a long or heavy train
A fish of the Wrasse family 
Double Header (Seattle),  a gay bar in Seattle, United States
"Double Header", a story from The Railway Series story, "The Eight Famous Engines"
"Double Header", a 1994-1995 episode of the Ren & Stimpy Show

See also  
Double-headed (disambiguation)